The 2017 Hong Kong Women's Sevens acted as a qualifier for the 2017–18 World Rugby Women's Sevens Series. The tournament was played on 7–8 April 2017 at Hong Kong Stadium in Hong Kong alongside the 2017 Hong Kong Sevens for men.

Format
12 teams, split into three groups of four. The group winners, runners up and the two best third ranked teams will enter the knockout stage. The overall winner will gain a spot on the 2017-18 World Rugby Women's Sevens series.

Teams

The 12 teams qualified as a result of their placings in continental competitions.

Europe 

Asia

Africa

South America

North America

Oceania

Pool Stage

Pool A

Pool B

Pool C

Knockout stage

Final standings

See also
2017 Hong Kong Sevens
2016-17 World Rugby Women's Sevens Series

References

External links
 Tournament Page 

2017
2017 rugby sevens competitions
2017 in women's rugby union
Rugby union
2017 in Asian rugby union